EP 1 (stylized as EP †) is the first EP by the rock band Crosses. It was recorded at Airport Studios in Los Angeles and self-released on August 2, 2011 in digital format. A low-quality version was made available for free, with higher-quality file types available for US $5. In November 2011, Crosses released a limited edition of the EP, including a colored vinyl 10", USB drive with remixes, and band merchandise.

Track listing 
 "This Is a Trick" – 3:07
 "Option" – 4:25
 "Bermuda Locket" – 3:42
 "Thholyghst" – 4:26
 "Cross" – 2:53

Note: All tracks on the album have a † symbol in their title, as substitute for the letter "T"; "Cross" is simply labelled "†".

Personnel 
Crosses
 Chino Moreno – vocals
 Shaun Lopez – guitar, keyboards; production, engineering, mixing
 Chuck Doom – bass

Additional musicians
 Duff McKagan – additional bass on "This is a Trick"
 Chris Robyn – live drums

Production and artwork
 Eric Broyhill – mastering
 Brendan Dekora – assistant engineer
 Brooke Nipar – photography
 Eric Stenman – mix engineer

References

External links 

Crosses: Desintegrando la cruz de Chino Moreno y Shaun López (Spanish)

2011 EPs
Crosses (band) albums